The koheru (Decapterus koheru) is a ray-finned fish of the genus Decapterus, part of the family Carangidae. It is endemic to New Zealand where it occurs from Manawatāwhi / Three Kings Islands to southern North Island. Juveniles prefer rocky inshore areas, while adults are known to form dense schools in offshore waters. They feed on zooplankton. It is a species of minor interest to commercial fisheries but is taken by recreational anglers.

References

 
 
 Tony Ayling & Geoffrey Cox, Collins Guide to the Sea Fishes of New Zealand,  (William Collins Publishers Ltd, Auckland, New Zealand 1982) 
 Wade Doak, A Photographic Guide to Sea Fishes of New Zealand, (New Holland Publishers (NZ) Ltd, Auckland, New Zealand 2003) 

Decapterus
Endemic marine fish of New Zealand
Fish of the North Island
Fish described in 1875